The following a list of awards and nominations received by American actor and director Tim Robbins.

Awards

Academy Awards

Golden Globe Awards

BAFTA Awards

Australian Film Institute

Berlin International Film Festival

Cannes Film Festival

Chicago Film Critics Association Awards

Karlovy Vary International Film Festival

References 

Lists of awards received by American actor
Lists of awards received by film director